Mario Aguilar may refer to:
 Mario Aguilar (sailor) (born 1925), Salvadoran sailor
 Mario Aguilar (academic) (born 1959), Chilean-British professor in religion and politics
 Mario Aguilar (footballer) (born 1984), Salvadoran footballer
 Mario Aguilar (percussionist) (fl. 1990s), former member of Tribe of Gypsies